Luis Salces (born 25 November 1994) is an Argentine professional footballer who plays as a forward for Gimnasia y Esgrima (M).

Career
Salces spent the first five years of his career with Gimnasia y Esgrima (J). He was an unused substitute twice during the 2012–13 Primera B Nacional campaign, before featuring seventeen times in the following season; including his debut against Huracán on 17 August 2013. In February 2016, Salces scored for the first time in a match with Almagro. He left at the end of 2017–18, after achieving one hundred and six appearances in all competitions whilst netting four times. On 12 July 2018, Salces joined Superleague Greece side Apollon Smyrnis. He suffered an epileptic seizure in training weeks later.

Apollon released Salces in December, prior to his arrival at Central Córdoba back in Argentina on 25 January 2019. He appeared four times off the bench as the club secured promotion from Primera B Nacional to the Primera División via the play-offs. Salces would soon depart though, as the forward agreed terms to remain in the second tier with Gimnasia y Esgrima (M). He made his debut on 18 August in a goalless draw at home to Defensores de Belgrano.

Career statistics
.

References

External links

1994 births
Living people
Sportspeople from Jujuy Province
Argentine footballers
Association football forwards
Argentine expatriate footballers
Expatriate footballers in Greece
Argentine expatriate sportspeople in Greece
Primera Nacional players
Gimnasia y Esgrima de Jujuy footballers
Apollon Smyrnis F.C. players
Central Córdoba de Santiago del Estero footballers
Gimnasia y Esgrima de Mendoza footballers